Hong Seung-hyun (born 28 December 1996) is a South Korean footballer who plays as defenderfor Gimhae FC in K3 League.

Career
Hong joined K League 2 side Daegu FC before 2016 season starts.

References

External links 

1996 births
Living people
Association football midfielders
South Korean footballers
Daegu FC players
FC Anyang players
K League 1 players
K League 2 players